Dichocrocis is a genus of moths of the family Crambidae. The genus was described by Julius Lederer in 1863.

Species
Dichocrocis acoluthalis West, 1931
Dichocrocis actinialis Hampson, 1899
Dichocrocis albilunalis Hampson, 1912
Dichocrocis alluaudalis Viette, 1953
Dichocrocis atrisectalis Hampson, 1908
Dichocrocis attemptalis (Snellen, 1890)
Dichocrocis bilinealis Hampson, 1896
Dichocrocis bimaculalis Kenrick, 1907
Dichocrocis biplagialis Hampson, 1918
Dichocrocis bistrigalis (Walker, 1866)
Dichocrocis clystalis Schaus, 1920)
Dichocrocis clytusalis (Walker, 1859)
Dichocrocis credulalis (Snellen, 1890)
Dichocrocis definita (Butler, 1889)
Dichocrocis dorsipunctalis Schaus, 1927
Dichocrocis erixantha (Meyrick, 1886)
Dichocrocis eubulealis (Walker, 1859)
Dichocrocis evaxalis (Walker, 1859)
Dichocrocis festivalis (Swinhoe, 1886)
Dichocrocis frenatalis Lederer, 1863
Dichocrocis fuscoalbalis Hampson, 1899
Dichocrocis galmeralis Schaus, 1927
Dichocrocis gyacalis Schaus, 1920
Dichocrocis leptalis Hampson, 1903
Dichocrocis leucostolalis Hampson, 1918
Dichocrocis liparalis West, 1931
Dichocrocis loxophora Hampson, 1912
Dichocrocis macrostidza Hampson, 1912
Dichocrocis megillalis (Walker, 1859)
Dichocrocis nigricinctalis Hampson, 1912
Dichocrocis pardalis Kenrick, 1907
Dichocrocis penniger Dyar, 1913
Dichocrocis philippinensis Hampson, 1912
Dichocrocis plenistigmalis (Warren, 1895)
Dichocrocis pseudpoeonalis Hampson, 1898
Dichocrocis punctilinealis Hampson, 1899
Dichocrocis pyrrhalis (Walker, 1859)
Dichocrocis rigidalis (Snellen, 1890)
Dichocrocis rubritinctalis Hampson, 1918
Dichocrocis strigimarginalis Hampson, 1899
Dichocrocis tigridalis Mabille, 1900
Dichocrocis tlapalis Schaus, 1920
Dichocrocis tripunctapex Hampson, 1899
Dichocrocis tyranthes Meyrick, 1897
Dichocrocis xanthocyma Hampson, 1898
Dichocrocis xanthoplagalis Hampson, 1912
Dichocrocis xuthusalis (Walker, 1859)
Dichocrocis zebralis (Moore, 1867)

Former species
Dichocrocis crocodora (Meyrick, 1934)
Dichocrocis pandamalis (Walker, 1859)
Dichocrocis plutusalis (Walker, 1859)
Dichocrocis punctiferalis (Guenée, 1854) 
Dichocrocis surusalis (Walker, 1859)

References

Spilomelinae
Crambidae genera
Taxa named by Julius Lederer